The Deep End is an American four-part documentary series about the life and work of controversial spiritual influencer and author Teal Swan.  The docu-series was developed for Freeform by director Jon Kasbe, producer Bits Sola, and executive producers Tom Yellin and Gabrielle Tenenbaum. Jon Kasbe was present during three years and had access to almost every aspect of Teal Swan. The series was announced on April 5, 2022, and premiered on Wednesday, May 18, 2022, with episodes streaming the day after premiere on Hulu.

Premise
Over the course of three years, filmmakers were granted full access to Swan and her cohort. The docu-series covers Swan's upbringing, her history of chronic physical, sexual, and emotional abuse, her rise to fame, and covers allegations of her being a cult leader.  Freeform calls the series, “an arresting and provocative exploration inside the world of one of today's most controversial spiritual teachers and her dedicated followers.”

Episodes

References

External links

2020s American documentary television series
2020s American television miniseries
2022 American television series debuts
2022 American television series endings
English-language television shows
Freeform (TV channel) original programming